The 1972 Buckeye Tennis Championships, als known as the Buckeye Classic, was a men's tennis tournament played on outdoor hard courts at the Buckeye Boys Ranch in Grove City, Columbus, Ohio in the United States that was part of Group D of the 1972 Grand Prix circuit. It was the third edition of the tournament and was held  from July 17 through July 23, 1972. First-seeded Jimmy Connors won the singles title and earned $5,000 first-prize money.

Finals

Singles

 Jimmy Connors defeated  Andrew Pattison 7–5, 6–3, 7–5
 It was Connors' fourth singles title of the year and of his career.

Doubles

 Jimmy Connors /  Pancho Gonzales defeated  Robert McKinley /  Dick Stockton 6–3, 7–5

References

External links
 ITF tournament edition details

Buckeye Tennis Championships
Buckeye Tennis Championships
Buckeye Tennis Championships
Buckeye Tennis Championships